Jerry Dino (20 September 1964 – 7 September 2001) was a Filipino judoka. He competed at the 1988 Summer Olympics and the 1992 Summer Olympics. He competed in the men's -60 kg category.

Dino also competed at the Southeast Asian Games, first participating in the 1985 edition in Bangkok. After his stint in the 1992 Summer Olympics in Barcelona, the Baguio native went on to serve as coach of the Philippine's judo team. He also established a T-shirt printing business in Baguio.

He died in a hospital after experiencing cardiac arrest on 7 September 2001 after making a visit to Southeast Asian Games-bound athletes at the Rizal Memorial Sports Complex.

References

External links
 

1964 births
2001 deaths
Filipino male judoka
Olympic judoka of the Philippines
Judoka at the 1988 Summer Olympics
Judoka at the 1992 Summer Olympics
Place of birth missing
People from Baguio
Competitors at the 1985 Southeast Asian Games
Competitors at the 1987 Southeast Asian Games
Southeast Asian Games gold medalists for the Philippines
Southeast Asian Games competitors for the Philippines
Southeast Asian Games medalists in judo